Karabakh (Azerbaijani: Qarabağ; Armenian: Ղարաբաղ Gharabagh) is a geographic region in present-day eastern Armenia and southwestern Azerbaijan, extending from the highlands of the Lesser Caucasus down to the lowlands between the rivers Kura and Aras

Karabakh or variants  Qarabagh, Gharabagh, Karabağ,  Qarabağ, Qara Bagh  may also refer to:

Places
Nagorno-Karabakh, meaning "Mountainous Karabakh", a disputed territory in the South Caucasus, de jure part of Azerbaijan, but partly controlled by the self-proclaimed Republic of Artsakh.
Karabakh Steppe, or Lowland Karabakh (see Karabakh)
Zangezur, the western highlands of Karabakh and the only part of Karabakh which lies within Armenia, roughly corresponding to the Province of Syunik

Afghanistan
Qarabagh District, Ghazni
Qarabagh District, Kabul

Azerbaijan
Qarabağ, Agdam
Qarabağ, Fuzuli
Qarabağlar (disambiguation)
Qarabağlar, Goychay
Qarabağlar, Nakhchivan
Qarabağlar, Samukh
Qarabağlar, Shamkir
Qarabağlı (disambiguation)
Qarabağlı, Agsu
Qarabağlı, Khachmaz
Qarabağlı, Salyan
Qarabağlı, Samukh
Qarabağlı, Şabran
Qarabağlılar, Tovuz

Iran
Qarah Bagh, North Khorasan
Qarah Bagh, Qazvin
Qarah Bagh, Razavi Khorasan
Qarah Bagh, West Azerbaijan
Qarah Bagh Rural District

Turkey
Büyükkarabağ, Bolvadin
Derekarabağ, Bolvadin
Karabağ, İncirliova
Karabağlar, Izmir
Karabağlar, Karacasu
Yenikarabağ, Sultandağı

Political entities
Karabakh Khanate (1747–1805)
Melikdoms of Karabakh (1603-1822), also known as "Khamsa", Armenian feudal entities that existed on the territory of modern Nagorno-Karabakh
Nagorno-Karabakh Autonomous Oblast (1923–1991), an autonomous oblast within the borders of the Azerbaijan Soviet Socialist Republic, Soviet Union (USSR), mostly inhabited by ethnic Armenians
Nagorno-Karabakh Republic (NKR; from 1991), now known as Republic of Artsakh, a breakaway state in the South Caucasus that is internationally recognized as a part of Azerbaijan
Province of Karabakh, within the Safavid Empire of Iran
Upper Karabakh Economic Region, one of the economic regions of Azerbaijan

Sports
FC Qarabag Khankendi, an Azerbaijani football club based in Baku
Qarabağ FK, an Azerbaijani football club

Other uses
 Karabakh dialect, an ancient Eastern Armenian dialect
 Karabakh horse
 Qara Baghi (Hazara tribe)

See also
 
Artsakh (disambiguation)
Artsakh (historic province), the historic name of the mountainous region of modern-day Karabakh
Principality of Khachen, a principality that existed in the mountainous region of modern-day Karabakh in the Middle Ages